A sealed road is a road whose surface has been permanently sealed by the use of one of several pavement treatments, often of composite construction. In some countries, such as Australia and New Zealand, this surface is generically referred to as "seal".

Surface treatments used on sealed roads include:
Asphalt concrete
Chipseal
Tarmac
Bitumen

See also
Road surface

References

Road construction
Pavements
Road infrastructure